Augusto De Marsanich (13 April 1893 – 10 February 1973) was an Italian fascist politician and the second leader of the Italian Social Movement (MSI).

Early years
De Marsanich was born in Rome. He enlisted in the Italian Army in 1916 and saw active service in the First World War. After leaving the army he became involved in politics and joined the National Fascist Party in 1920. He was a journalist by profession and worked for La Stampa most notably.

Under the fascists
Although he did not achieve high office, De Marsanich held a number of positions within the fascist movement. He served as a director of the local party in Latium and Sabine from 1927 to 1929, briefly serving as a member of the Fascist Grand Council in the latter year. 1929 also saw him take a seat in the Chamber of Deputies, where he remained a member until 1943. Seen as something of a bureaucrat, he variously served with the Syndical Office, as head of the party's Legal Office, President of the Syndical Confederation of Commerce and Vice-President of the Corporation for the Building Trades.

He served as under-secretary of communications from 1935 to 1943 and also represented Italy at the League of Nations during the Ethiopia crisis. He also was a regular contributor to a number of fascist journals, notably Giuseppe Bottai's Critica Fascista and served as a director of the fascist monthly Il Lavoro Fascista. As the maternal uncle of novelist Alberto Moravia De Marsanich helped to ensure that he enjoyed the patronage of Benito Mussolini's government.

He continued to hold a number of positions in the Italian Social Republic, most notably acting as Assistant Postmaster-General, as well as serving as chairman of both the Banco di Roma and Alfa Romeo. Within the Salo Republic he largely belonged to the moderate tendency that cautioned against the growing atmosphere of violence and the pervading influence of Nazism.

Post-war activity
De Marsanich joined the MSI after the Second World War and was part of the more moderate tendency with the party. He became leader in 1950 and under his leadership the MSI became more fully committed to the parliamentary route to government and he even sought alliances with other parties, including Christian Democracy, the Italian Liberal Party and the Monarchist National Party. In his attempts to form a united front of anti-communism he was frustrated by more hard-line fascist loyalists such as Giorgio Almirante. In his capacity as MSI leader De Marsanich also served as part of the four man leadership of the European Social Movement (ESM), along with Per Engdahl, Maurice Bardèche and Karl-Heinz Priester. His commitment to moderation in the MSI was frequently at odds with his enthusiastic support for the ESM, a group that contained several leading neo-Nazi activists.

He was succeeded as leader by fellow moderate Arturo Michelini in 1954, although he continued to be a leading MSI figure as national secretary. He was again elected to the Italian Chamber of Deputies in 1953 and the Italian Senate in 1968. He was also unsuccessful candidate for the President of Italy in 1964. In 1971 the veteran De Marsanich was appointed to President of the MSI, having previously been made honorary Vice-President in 1955.

References

1893 births
1973 deaths
Politicians from Rome
Candidates for President of Italy
Italian military personnel of World War I
Italian Social Movement politicians
People of the Italian Social Republic
Alfa Romeo people
20th-century Italian politicians
Italian anti-communists